Alexander Biggar was a Scottish professional footballer who played as an outside left.

Career
Born in New Cumnock, Biggar played for Lanemark, Bradford City and Tottenham Hotspur. For Bradford City, he made 1 appearance in the Football League.

Sources

References

Year of birth missing
Year of death missing
Scottish footballers
Lanemark F.C. players
Bradford City A.F.C. players
Tottenham Hotspur F.C. players
English Football League players
Association football outside forwards